Ansonia station is a commuter rail station on the Waterbury Branch of the Metro-North Railroad's New Haven Line, located in Ansonia, Connecticut.

Station layout
This station has one low-level side platform to the east of the track. The station is owned and operated by the Connecticut Department of Transportation (ConnDOT), but Metro-North is responsible for maintaining platform lighting, trash, and snow removal. There is a parking lot with 50 parking spaces managed by the city of Ansonia.

In 2018, ConnDOT awarded a grant of $389,000 to the city of Ansonia for safety and beautification improvements to the station including improved lighting, sidewalks, and accessibility.

Future
In November 2021, Governor Lamont announced at Ansonia station that both Derby and Ansonia stations will be equipped with high platforms and other improvements. While Derby station has been fully funded and awaiting construction, Ansonia station still awaits funding.

References

External links

 Station from Google Maps Street View

Buildings and structures in Ansonia, Connecticut
Stations along New York, New Haven and Hartford Railroad lines
Metro-North Railroad stations in Connecticut
Railroad stations in New Haven County, Connecticut
Transportation in New Haven County, Connecticut